Aaron Splaine (born 13 October 1996) is a Scottish professional footballer who plays as a midfielder for Clyde. Splaine, who started his career as a youth player for Queen of the South, has also played for Kilmarnock, Dunfermline Athletic, Annan Athletic, Northern Irish side Derry City and Gibraltarian clubs Europa Point and Bruno's Magpies.

Career
Born in Spain, Splaine was brought up in Newton Stewart and joined local side Queen of the South at youth level. Splaine spent five years at Palmerston Park, before following the Doonhamers manager Allan Johnston to Kilmarnock when he took over as manager in 2013.

Splaine made his debut in the penultimate Scottish Premiership match of the 2014–15 season, against Ross County at Rugby Park. Although Kilmarnock lost the match 1–2, Splaine was praised for the composed way that he operated in midfield, with BBC Scotland correspondent Kenny Crawford describing him as looking like a "seasoned professional". Splaine went on to make a further eight appearances for the club, before being released on 23 May 2016 along with five other players at the end of their contract.

After six months away from football, Splaine subsequently had trials with Leeds United and Burnley, before signing a one-year deal with Scottish Championship club Dunfermline Athletic on 15 June 2017, joining up with former Doonhamers and Killie manager Allan Johnston. Splaine started the season in-and-out of the first team, making his full league debut for the club versus Queen of the South in October. Splaine suffered a season ending leg-break in a Fife Cup match against Burntisland Shipyard in November 2017, and was released by the club in May 2018, following the end of his contract.

After leaving Dunfermline, Splaine joined former Pars teammate Dean Shiels in signing for  side Derry City. Splaine scored on his debut for the club, in a 2–1 victory over Limerick. He left the club at the end of the 2018 season. In August 2019, Splaine joined Europa Point in Gibraltar. He made his debut on 21 August in a 5–0 defeat to Lynx.

After a spell with  Bruno's Magpies, Splaine returned to Scottish football in August 2020 with Annan Athletic. In June 2021, Splaine moved up a division to sign for Scottish League One club Clyde.

Career statistics

References

External links

1996 births
Living people
Scottish footballers
Kilmarnock F.C. players
Dunfermline Athletic F.C. players
Derry City F.C. players
Europa Point F.C. players
Annan Athletic F.C. players
Clyde F.C. players
F.C. Bruno's Magpies players
Scottish Professional Football League players
Association football midfielders